Californium(III) oxyfluoride is a radioactive inorganic compound with a chemical formula CfOF, synthesized in the 1960s. This salt crystallizes with the cubic fluorite structure, with the oxide and fluoride anions randomly distributed in anion sites.

Californium(III) oxyfluoride is an oxyfluoride and a mixed anion compound. It can be prepared by the hydrolysis of CfF3 at high temperature.

References

Californium compounds
Oxyfluorides